Amity Gaige (born 1972) is an American novelist, known for her books O My Darling, The Folded World, Schroder, and Sea Wife. She is a 2016 Guggenheim Fellow in Fiction.

Early life
Amity Gaige was born in Charlotte, North Carolina, United States, to an academic father and a psychologist mother.  The Gaige family moved several times before settling in Reading, Pennsylvania. She graduated from Brown University, where she studied English and theater.  She later obtained an M.F.A. from the Iowa Writers' Workshop (1999).

Career
Her first novel, O My Darling (Other Press, 2005) won her a place in the inaugural year of the National Book Foundation’s 5 Under 35 Awards.

Her second novel, The Folded World, was published in 2007 (Other Press, Random House), and garnered independent publishing awards that year.

Her third novel, Schroder (Twelve Books, 2013) was a shortlist nominee for Britain's inaugural GB£40,000 Folio Prize in 2014. The novel stirred controversy in its depiction of a reckless young father who flees with his six-year-old daughter on a road trip through New England after a custody battle. The author drew inspiration from  the real-life Christian Gerhartsreiter story,  though the book is not a novelization of that story. In style and form, Schroder drew comparison to works by Nabokov.<ref>{{cite web|author= |url=https://www.bostonglobe.com/arts/books/2013/02/14/book-review-schroder-amity-gaige/PCF9efhpjvAi0DIVEx7rVI/story.html |title=Book review: "Schroder by Amity Gaige - Books |publisher=The Boston Globe |date=2013-02-14 |accessdate=2013-08-25}}</ref> The Los Angeles Times wrote, "Schroder’s closest literary relative is probably Lolita (minus the pedophilia)," and Kathryn Schulz suggested that Gaige intended Schroder as an homage and an "appropriation" of Lolita in New York Magazine, which published a scratched-out image of Nabokov's cover art.  Gaige also cited Pale Fire as an influence in an interview with The New York Times' John Williams.
The book was sold pre-publication for translation into fifteen languages, and was endorsed on the Dutch television show De Wereld Draait Door, sending the book into numerous reprintings.  In the U.S., the book won endorsements from Jonathan Franzen and Jennifer Egan, and was reviewed in nearly every major print outlet, making it one of the most heavily reviewed books of the year. According to WorldCat, the book is held in 3,873 libraries, with editions in 8 languages.

Her fourth novel, Sea Wife, was published in 2020 (Knopf). The novel was selected as a Group Text pick by Elisabeth Egan of The New York Times, who wrote in her review, "Gaige tows you to tragedy with the graceful crawl of a poet and the motorboat intensity of a suspense author. And yet, when you find yourself at the deep end of this book, gasping for breath, you will still be shocked by what you find at the bottom.”   The maritime metaphors continued in a People Magazine review, which selected Sea Wife as Book of the Week, stating “Gaige’s razor-sharp novel is wise to marital and broader politics.  But it’s also such gripping escapism that it feels like a lifeboat.”  In an interview with Susan Choi in The Millions, Gaige talked about the research involved in writing a book set at sea, "It’s possible that the tension the reader feels in reading Sea Wife runs parallel to the tension of the author trying to write it. Maybe I’ve bought into a kind of Stanislavskian theory of needing the stakes of my writing to be as high as those of my characters. The process was not without casualty."

Awards and honors

2014 Folio Prize shortlist for Schroder''

References

1972 births
Living people
21st-century American novelists
Iowa Writers' Workshop alumni
American women novelists
21st-century American women writers
Writers from Charlotte, North Carolina
Writers from Reading, Pennsylvania
Brown University alumni
Novelists from Pennsylvania
Novelists from North Carolina